Crofter Hand Woven Harris Tweed Co Ltd v Veitch [1941] UKHL 2 is a landmark UK labour law case on the right to take part in collective bargaining. However, the actual decision which appears to allow secondary action may have been limited by developments from the 1980s.

Lord Wright famously affirmed that:

Facts
In the Harris Tweed industry on the Isle of Lewis in the Outer Hebrides, several independent producers of tweed cloth were in a dispute with the Transport and General Workers' Union over working conditions. The TGWU called on dockers in Stornoway, also TGWU members, to refuse to handle the yarn imported to the island by the producers.

Judgment
The House of Lords held that there was no actionable conspiracy in this case. Lord Chancellor Simon said,

Lord Thankerton said the following.

Lord Wright affirmed that the union had a right to take part in collective bargaining and more than that said,

See also

UK labour law

Notes

References

United Kingdom strike case law
United Kingdom labour case law
House of Lords cases
1942 in British law
1942 in Scotland
1942 in case law
Scottish case law
Crofting
History of the Outer Hebrides
Economic history of Scotland
United Kingdom trade union case law
1942 in labor relations